Oksana Aleksandrovna Pochepa (born 20 July 1984 in Rostov-on-Don) is a Russian pop singer and model.

Pochepa first appeared on the Russian music charts when she was 13 years old. She performed in a band called Maloletka (aka Малолетка; "Jailbait"/ "Underaged"), and sang under the pseudonym of Akula (Shark). In 2001, she released her first solo album, Kislotniy DJ (Acidic DJ). She has performed with Ruki Vverh! She has released both of her albums on the well-known label APC Records.

In 2007, she appeared in a Maxim magazine photo shoot.

Discography
 Кислотный DJ (Kislotnyĭ DJ/Acid DJ)
 Без любви (Bez lyubvi/Without love)

References

External links
  (Russian)
 Oksana Pochepa Russian fan site

1984 births
Living people
Musicians from Rostov-on-Don
Russian pop singers
21st-century Russian women singers
21st-century Russian singers